Pomaderris intermedia, commonly known as lemon dogwood, is a species of flowering plant in the family Rhamnaceae and is endemic to south-eastern Australia. It is a shrub with hairy stems, elliptic to egg-shaped leaves, and clusters of yellow flowers.

Description
The upper surface of the leaves is glabrous and the lower surface covered with greyish, star-shaped hairs. Flowering occurs in September and October.

Taxonomy
Pomaderris intermedia was first formally described in 1825 by Augustin Pyramus de Candolle in Prodromus Systematis Naturalis Regni Vegetabilis from an unpublished description by Franz Sieber. The specific epithet (intermedia) refers to a close association with two other Pomaderris species.

Distribution and habitat
Lemon dogwood grows in forest, woodland and heath, and is found from south from the Gibraltar Range National Park in New South Wales to Western Port and French Island in Victoria, and in scattered locations in Tamania, including on some Bass Strait islands.

Conservation status
This pomaderris is listed as "rare" under the Tasmanian Government Threatened Species Protection Act 1995.

References

Flora of New South Wales
intermedia
Flora of Victoria (Australia)
Flora of Tasmania
Flora of the Australian Capital Territory
Plants described in 1825
Taxa named by Augustin Pyramus de Candolle